Encina is an unincorporated community in Baker County, Oregon, United States.

Encina is Spanish for "evergreen oak". The railroad siding of the Union Pacific Railroad mainline at this locale was named "Oak Cut" at the time of its construction, but the name was "cumbersome" so it was renamed by railroad agent J. C. Mayo, who had lived in Mexico. Encina is the place of Johnson Spring. Named for the first owner of what is now Alder Grove Ranch that sits on Alder Creek with water rights from 1883. The Johnson's are buried in Pleasant Valley Cemetery on Dry Creek Cutoff between Alder Creek Road and Dry Creek Road.

Railway history
Encina is the summit of the Huntington Subdivision mainline. The tracks that go through Encina were originally owned by the Oregon Railway & Navigation Company that built the railroad from 1882 to 1884.

References

External links
Images of Encina from Flickr

Unincorporated communities in Baker County, Oregon
Unincorporated communities in Oregon